This is a list of Bollywood films that were released in 2019.

Box office collection 
The highest-grossing Bollywood films released in 2019, by worldwide box office gross revenue, are as follows.

January–March

April–June

July–September

October–December

See also 
 List of Bollywood films of 2020
 List of Bollywood films of 2018

Notes

References 

2019
Bollywood
Bollywood